Katrineholms VK is a volleyball club in Katrineholm, Sweden, established on 30 March 1977 as a breakout out of KFUM Katrineholm's volleyball section. The club won the Swedish women's national championship in 2010, 2011 and 2013

References

External links
Official website 

1977 establishments in Sweden
Sport in Katrineholm
Volleyball clubs established in 1977
Swedish volleyball clubs